Jonnu Andre Smith (born August 22, 1995) is an American football tight end for the Atlanta Falcons of the National Football League (NFL). He played college football at FIU and was selected by the Tennessee Titans in the third round of the 2017 NFL Draft. After four seasons with the Titans, he joined the New England Patriots, and was later traded to the Falcons.

Early life
Smith was raised in North Philadelphia, Pennsylvania by his parents, Wayne and Karen Smith. He is the youngest of six children. When he was born, Karen was pressured by nurses to immediately name him due to hospital policies. After praying, she came up with the name Jonnu. He began playing Pop Warner football at age 5.

Smith endured a lot of challenges as a youngster in Philadelphia. After his brother was arrested and one of his friends was killed on the streets, his family didn't have the financial means to uproot. For his own safety, he moved in with his maternal aunt and uncle in Ocala, Florida. He started playing high school football at West Port Highschool, and even though he was far from a touted recruit he earned a scholarship to Florida International.

College career
Smith played college football at Florida International University, where he majored in liberal studies. As a freshman in 2013, Smith played 12 games with 388 receiving yards and two touchdowns. As a sophomore in 2014, he played 12 games with 710 receiving yards and eight touchdowns. As a junior in 2015, he played in 8 games with 397 receiving yards and four touchdowns. As a senior in 2016, he played 11 games with 506 receiving yards and four touchdowns.

Smith was invited to play in the 2017 Senior Bowl, but was overshadowed by other tight ends who were considered first and second round picks.

Statistics

Professional career
Smith was one of 19 tight ends who received an invitation to attend the NFL Scouting Combine in Indianapolis, Indiana. He had an impressive performance and finished in the top five among tight ends in the majority of the drills. He placed second in the vertical jump and short shuttle, tied for third in the bench press, fourth in the broad jump, and finished sixth in the 40-yard dash in his position group. On March 29, 2017, Smith opted to participate at FIU's pro day, along with Dieugot Joseph and ten other teammates. He performed the three-cone drill and positional drills for scouts and team representatives from 29 NFL teams and the Winnipeg Blue Bombers of the Canadian Football League. Throughout the pre-draft process, Smith had private workouts and visits with Atlanta Falcons, Tennessee Titans, New Orleans Saints, Miami Dolphins, and Minnesota Vikings. At the conclusion of the pre-draft process, Smith was projected to be a fourth or fifth round pick by NFL draft experts and analysts. He was ranked the tenth best tight end in the draft by NFLDraftScout.com and was ranked the 12th best tight end by NFL analyst Gil Brandt.

Tennessee Titans
The Tennessee Titans selected Smith in the third round with the 100th overall pick in the 2017 NFL Draft,  the sixth tight end selected. He was the seventh player selected in FIU's school history and third-highest selection in school history. The Titans selected Smith to fill a void in their two tight end sets after Anthony Fasano departed in free agency.

2017 season
On May 17, 2017, the Titans signed Smith to a four-year, $3.10 million contract that included a signing bonus of $706,288.

Throughout training camp, Smith competed against veterans Jace Amaro and Phillip Supernaw to be the Titans' second tight end behind veteran Delanie Walker.

Smith made his NFL debut starting in the Titans' season-opening 26–16 loss to the Oakland Raiders. In the next game, he recorded two receptions for 30 yards and scored his first NFL touchdown on a 32-yard screen pass from Marcus Mariota during the fourth quarter of a 37–16 road victory over the Jacksonville Jaguars. During Week 3 against the Seattle Seahawks, Smith caught a 24-yard touchdown during the third quarter of a 33–27 victory. During Week 5 against the Miami Dolphins, he caught a season-high five passes for 21 yards in the 16-10 road loss.

Smith finished his rookie year with 18 receptions for 157 yards and two touchdowns.

The Titans finished second in the AFC South with a 9–7 record and made the playoffs as a Wild Card team. In the Wild Card Round, the Titans played the Kansas City Chiefs. Smith caught two passes for 15 yards. In the Divisional Round against the New England Patriots Smith recorded a four-yard reception before suffering a torn MCL in the 35–14 loss.

2018 season

Smith was named the Titan’s top tight end on the depth chart after Walker suffered a dislocated ankle during the season-opening 27-20 road loss to the Miami Dolphins. Smith initially struggled filling Delanie Walker's shoes, but he caught his first touchdown of the season on a shovel pass from Mariota during Week 9 against the Dallas Cowboys in a 28-14 road victory. In the next game against the New England Patriots, Smith caught four passes for 45 yards and a touchdown in the 34–10 victory. Two weeks later, he caught a 61-yard touchdown pass as the Titans lost to the Houston Texans on the road by a score of 34–17. However, during a 30–9 victory against the Jacksonville Jaguars in Week 14, he suffered a season-ending MCL injury.

Smith finished the 2018 season with 20 receptions for 258 yards and three touchdowns in 13 games. Without Smith, the Titans finished with a 9–7 record and narrowly missed out on the playoffs.

2019 season

Smith returned from his injury in time for the Titans' season opener against the Cleveland Browns. He recorded one reception for seven yards and a 10-yard rush in the 43–13 road victory. During Week 5 against the Buffalo Bills, Smith caught a 57-yard reception as the Titans lost 14–7. Two weeks later against the Los Angeles Chargers, he caught three passes for 64 yards as the Titans won 23–20. In the next game against the Tampa Bay Buccaneers, he caught six passes for 78 yards and his first touchdown of the season from Ryan Tannehill. During Week 14 against the Oakland Raiders, Smith caught three passes for 29 yards and a touchdown in the 42-21 road victory. In the next game against the Houston Texans, he caught five passes for 60 yards and had a 57-yard rush in the 24–21 loss. Smith continued his momentum the next game against the New Orleans Saints, catching three passes for 63 yards and a touchdown as the Titans lost 38–28.

Smith finished the 2019 season setting career-highs in receptions with 35 and receiving yards with 439 along with tying a career-high in touchdowns with three. He also rushed four times for 78 yards.

The Titans finished second in the AFC South with a 9–7 record and made the playoffs as a Wild Card team. In the Divisional Round against the Baltimore Ravens, Smith caught a one-handed touchdown during the first quarter of the 28-12 road victory.

2020 season
After recording a receiving touchdown in Week 1 in a 16–14 victory over the Denver Broncos, Smith had four receptions for 84 receiving yards and two receiving touchdowns in a 33–30 victory over the Jacksonville Jaguars in Week 2.
In Week 5 against the Buffalo Bills on Tuesday Night Football, Smith recorded five catches for 40 yards and two receiving touchdowns during the 42–16 win. In Week 10, against the Indianapolis Colts, he scored his first  professional rushing touchdown in the 34–17 loss. He finished the 2020 season with 41 receptions for 448 receiving yards and eight receiving touchdowns in 15 games.

New England Patriots
On March 19, 2021, the New England Patriots signed Smith to a four-year, $50 million deal. He finished the 2021 season with 28 catches for 294 yards and one touchdown.

Smith entered the 2022 season as the No. 2 tight end behind Hunter Henry. He finished the season with 27 catches for 245 yards.

Atlanta Falcons
On March 15, 2023, Smith was traded to the Atlanta Falcons in exchange for a 2023 seventh-round draft pick.

NFL career statistics

Regular season

Postseason

Personal life
Smith is a Christian. Smith has said, “[Faith is] the foundation of everything I do, and I am so thankful for the way I was raised because I lean on the things I learned as a kid today as a grown man. ... I am a man of faith, and I am a man of God and I truly believe that everything is ordained for a purpose.”

Smith's best friend, Willie “Quasim” Jefferson, died from a gunshot in October 2016. Smith gave his son Jaiyen the middle name Quasim in honor of Jefferson. Smith competed in weightlifting, finishing second in the county in the 219-pound weight class.

Smith credits his mother, Karen, for his successes. When Smith was four his father Wayne passed away in a work-related tow truck accident at the age of 40. As a result Karen raised all six children by herself. "My mother is my rock," said Smith. "It was tough, but we always got what we needed—not necessarily what we wanted all the time—but what we needed. She was so strong all the time."

On October 31, 2016, Smith was involved in an altercation with his girlfriend, Mary Gaspar, who was five months pregnant with their child. The argument took place in their campus dorm room, where Gaspar used a kitchen pot and poured boiling hot water onto Smith. Smith suffered burns, and was ruled out for the rest of his senior year. Gaspar was arrested for aggravated battery, and entered a not guilty plea. The charges against her were dropped the following year after delivering their child.

References

External links

New England Patriots bio

1995 births
Living people
American football tight ends
Atlanta Falcons players
Ed Block Courage Award recipients
FIU Panthers football players
New England Patriots players
Players of American football from Florida
Sportspeople from Ocala, Florida
Tennessee Titans players